K. D. Thirunavukkarasu (born 1931) is a Tamil scholar, writer, critic and translator from Tamil Nadu, India.

Thirunavukkarasu is an alumnus of Pachaiyappa's College, Chennai. He obtained a M.A, M.Litt. and a PhD and worked as a professor at the International Institute of Tamil Studies in Chennai. In 1974, he was awarded the Sahitya Akademi Award for Tamil for his literary criticism Thirukkural Needhi Illakkiyam (lit. Thirukkural, a moralist literature).

Partial bibliography
Chieftains of the Sangam age
A Critical study of Dr. Mu. Va's works
Thirukkural needhi illakkiyam
Thirukkural karpanai thiranum nataka nalanum
Arunmozhi aayvuth thogudhi
Then kizhakku aasiya nadugalil thamilar panpadu
(trans.)Rajaram mohan roy (biography)
(trans.)Jeevanandha Das (biography)

References

1931 births
Living people
20th-century Indian translators
Recipients of the Sahitya Akademi Award in Tamil
Tamil writers
Indian literary critics
Writers from Chennai
Indian Tamil people